Dichloromethane dehalogenase (EC 4.5.1.3; systematic name dichloromethane chloride-lyase (adding H2O; chloride-hydrolysing; formaldehyde-forming)) is a lyase enzyme that generates formaldehyde.

 dichloromethane + H2O = formaldehyde + 2 chloride

Glutathione is required for its activity.

References

External links 
 

EC 4.5